Statistics of Primera División Uruguaya for the 2003 season.

Overview
It was contested by 18 teams, and Peñarol won the championship.

Apertura

Clausura

Overall

Playoff
Peñarol 1-0 Nacional
Peñarol won the championship.

References
 Uruguay - List of final tables (RSSSF)

Uruguayan Primera División seasons
Uru
2003 in Uruguayan football